Direction – Slovak Social Democracy (SMER–SSD), formerly and legally called Direction – Social Democracy (SMER–SD), is a left-wing populist political party in Slovakia led by the former prime minister Robert Fico. The party claims to represent social democracy with Slovak national specifics.

It was founded in 1999 as a splinter from the post-communist Party of the Democratic Left, a successor to the Communist Party of Slovakia, which was a branch of the then-ruling Communist Party of Czechoslovakia (KSČ) in the Czechoslovak Socialist Republic. Initially a big tent populist party, started to build its national brand as a Third Way alternative in 2003. It switched its name to Direction – Social Democracy and adopted social democratic positions after merging with several minor centre-left parties in 2005.

SMER–SD won the 2006 parliamentary election and formed a coalition government with two minor nationalist parties. Fico's First Cabinet continued the European integration of Slovakia while abandoning the economic-liberal reforms of the two previous Dzurinda's Cabinets. Despite the landslide victory in the following parliamentary election, it served in the opposition to the centre-right Radičová's Cabinet. The party won a majority of seats in the 2012 snap parliamentary election and Robert Fico formed his second cabinet. In the following parliamentary election, its popularity declined sharply, but nevertheless Fico formed an unexpected coalition with 3 minor parties. In 2018, the Murder of investigative journalist Ján Kuciak triggered mass protests and a political crisis resulting in the prime minister's resignation. SMER–SD led the reshuffled Pellegrini's Cabinet until the following parliamentary election. The party returned to the opposition in 2020.

SMER–SD is associated with dozens of corruption scandals, being described as the Party of European Socialists' "enfant terrible", alongside the Romanian Social Democratic Party. At the end of the 2010s, the party began to radicalize. Its rhetoric currently includes Russophilic, anti-American, anti-LGBT, Romaphobic, and anti-vaccination views.

History

Foundation and early years (1999–2006) 
Originally named Direction, the party was founded on 8 November 1999, emerging as a breakaway from the post-Communist Party of the Democratic Left (SDĽ), the successor of the original Communist Party of Slovakia and the governing party from 1998 to 2002. Under Robert Fico, at the time one of the most popular politicians in the country, it quickly became one of the most popular parties in Slovakia, while the SDĽ experienced a constant decrease within popularity. In the 2002 Slovak parliamentary election, its first formal election period, it became the third-largest party in the National Council of the Slovak Republic, with 25 of 150 seats. In 2003, it changed its formal name to Direction (Third Way), or Smer (tretia cesta) in Slovak and Party of Civic Understanding merged into the party.

In 2005, the party absorbed the SDĽ and the Social Democratic Alternative, a small social democratic party that split from the original SDĽ somewhat later than Direction did, in addition to the Social Democratic Party of Slovakia. Founded in 1990, the party became known for the leadership of Alexander Dubček, and Direction adopted the Smer–SD name. Following the party's victory in 2006, Smer–SD entered into a coalition with the nationalist Slovak National Party (SNS) and was readmitted into the Party of European Socialists (PES) in 2008. It later formed another coalition with the SNS in 2016.

Government (2006–2010) 

In the 2006 Slovak parliamentary election, the party won 29.1% of the popular vote and 50 of 150 seats. Following that election, Smer-SD formed a coalition government with the People's Party – Movement for a Democratic Slovakia (HZDS) and the SNS, an extremist nationalist party.

On 12 October 2006, the party was temporarily suspended from membership in the PES. The resolution to suspend the party referred specifically to the PES Declaration "For a modern, pluralist and tolerant Europe", adopted in Berlin by the PES congress in 2001, which states that "all PES parties adhere to the following principles ... [and] to refrain from any form of political alliance or co-operation at all levels with any political party which incites or attempts to stir up racial or ethnic prejudices and racial hatred." In The Slovak Spectator, the PES chairman Poul Nyrup Rasmussen commented: "Most of our members stood solidly behind our values, according to which forming a coalition with the extreme right is unacceptable." The party was readmitted on 14 February 2008 after its chairman Fico and SNS leader Jan Slota pledged in a letter to respect European values, human rights, and all ethnic minorities.

Opposition (2010–2012) 

Although the party won the most votes in the 2010 Slovak parliamentary election, with a lead of 20% over the second-place Slovak Democratic and Christian Union – Democratic Party (SDKÚ), they had not been able to form a government because of losses sustained by their coalition partners. Their result, 34.8%, gave them 62 of 150 seats in the National Council, but the HZDS failed to cross the 5% threshold, losing all their seats, and the SNS was reduced to nine seats. The four opposition centre-right parties (the Christian Democratic Movement, Freedom and Solidarity, Most–Híd, and SDKÚ) were able to form a new government.

Government (2012–2020) 

In the 2012 Slovak parliamentary election, Smer–SD won 44.4% of the votes and became the largest party in the National Council, with an absolute majority of 83 seats (out of 150). Fico's Second Cabinet was the first single-party government in Slovakia since 1993. In the 2014 European Parliament election in Slovakia, Smer–SD came in first place nationally, receiving 24.09% of the vote and electing four Members of the European Parliament.

Despite suffering a significant loss in support as a result of strikes by teachers and nurses earlier in the year, Smer–SD won the 5 March 2016 parliamentary election with 28.3% of the vote and 49 of 150 seats, and subsequently formed Fico's Third Cabinet in a coalition government with Most–Híd, Network, and the Slovak National Party. Prime Minister Fico resigned in the wake of the political crisis following the murder of Ján Kuciak and was replaced by Peter Pellegrini, with the same majority. However, Fico remained leader of Smer-SD.

Back into opposition and departure of the Pellegrini group (2020–present) 

The party managed to score 18.29% in the 2020 Slovak parliamentary election, which was 2 to 3 percent more than the latest polls showed, but it was still a decrease of 10% compared to previous elections. The party occupied 38 seats in parliament. Pellegrini, the chairman of the Fico parliamentary group, became the vice-chairman of the National Council for the Opposition on the basis of post-election negotiations. In May 2020, two deputies for SMER–SD (Ján Podmanický and Marián Kéry) founded a value policy platform with deputies from KDŽP, elected as a candidate of the Kotlebists – People's Party Our Slovakia. Because of this, Pellegrini sharply criticized them, while Fico defended Podmanický. In May 2020, Podmanický also left the Smer–SD parliamentary group after criticism from his own ranks.

As early as April 2020, party vice-chairman Pellegrini announced his ambition to run for party chairman as Smer-SD's most popular politician, winning 170,000 more votes than the chairman. Fico reacted strongly, saying that he did not intend to resign and wanted to remain at the head of the party, while Pellegrini gradually began to tighten his criticism of Fico and the party's situation. Pellegrini criticized the fact that the party's presidency had not met since the election and the date of the parliament was unknown. Pellegrini demanded that the assembly be held as soon as possible, while Fico insisted that the nomination assembly take place only at a ceremonial assembly in December 2020.

At a June 2020 press conference in Banská Bystrica, Pellegrini announced that he would resign as Vice-Chairman of Smer–SD and leave the party in the near future. He also outlined the establishment of a new party, Voice – Social Democracy (HLAS-SD), which he said should be social democratic, but refuse to be liberal. Around that time, Fico had already offered Pellegrini the position of party chairman, provided that he maintained his influence in the party, an offer which was rejected by Pellegrini. In the first FOCUS survey, 21.4% of respondents said they would vote for the new Pellegrini party, while those saying they would vote for the original Smer-SD remained at 9.6%. At a press conference one week following the announcement of Pellegrini's departure, another 10 deputies announced they would leave the party, including Vice-Presidents Peter Žiga and Richard Raši, Bureau member Denisa Saková and long-standing deputies and party members. At the same time, together with Pellegrini, they announced the creation of a new social-democratic party at the press conference, which they would join. Political scientist Grigory Mesezhnikov postulated that after the departure of the Pellegrini group, the SMER-SD could move further to the left into the spectrum of the radical to communist left.

Ideology 
 
At the end of the 2010s, and especially after the departure of the faction around Peter Pellegrini (HLAS) in 2020, the party turned from pro-European left to nationalist or patriotic left.

Since the 2020 COVID-19 pandemic, anti-lockdown and anti-vaccination rhetoric was observed in the party's ideology. The top officials, including Robert Fico, began to actively appear in alternative and conspiracy media, as well as to spread or create multiple hoaxes and conspiracies.

Alongside the Romanian Social Democratic Party, it has been described as the PES' "enfant terrible".

Controversy

Corruption 
The party is associated with many corruption cases in Slovakia. During the 12 years during which it ruled, the media revealed more than 30 alleged corruption cases in which Slovakia was to lose a total of 20 billion euros.

As no corruption case has yet been proven in court, and no conviction resulting from a party member's complicity in corruption cases been attained, the party strongly rejects the fact that it has a number of corruption scandals. Its chairman Fico usually points to the cases of his opponents when asked about specific corruption cases. More than once, Fico verbally attacked the media or the journalist himself who asked these questions. Some prominent members of Smer-SD, in response to the corruption cases, especially in the 2010s, have admitted that it is a thing of the past and that they made mistakes, while denying that corruption in the state was high.

Election results

National Council

European Parliament

President

See also 
 Alliance of Independent Social Democrats
 Czech Social Democratic Party
 Politics of Slovakia

Notes

Footnotes

External links 
 Official party website 
 Entry in Slovak Interior Ministry's Register of Parties 

 
1999 establishments in Slovakia
Full member parties of the Socialist International
Nationalist parties in Slovakia
Party of European Socialists member parties
Political parties established in 1999
Social democratic parties in Slovakia